This is a list of Honorary Fellows of Darwin College, Cambridge.

 Sir Michael Atiyah
 Sir Arnold Burgen
 Robin Carrell
 John Clarke
 Sir Alan Fersht
 Sir Tony Hoare
 Sir Andrew Huxley
 Max Perutz
 Milo Keynes
 Stephen Keynes
 Sir Geoffrey Lloyd
 Martin Rees, Baron Rees of Ludlow
 Ekhard Salje
 Amartya Sen
 Dame Jean Thomas
 Sir Gregory Winter

Darwin College, Cambridge
Fellows of Darwin College, Cambridge
Darwin